Cassandra Sánchez Navarro (born 3 July 1991) is a Mexican actress, best known for her role Chelito Durán in the Televisa's telenovela Corona de lágrimas, adaption of the 1965 telenovela of the same name. Later she stood out as a villain in the telenovela Quiero amarte, where she played Flavia. Recently she has had important roles in series such as La bella y las bestias (2018), This Is Silvia Pinal (2019), where she played Silvia Pinal's deceased daughter, Viridiana Alatriste. Cassandra is daughter of the actress Mónica Sánchez Navarro, niece of the actor Rafael Sánchez Navarro, granddaughter of the actors Manolo Fábregas and Fela Fábregas, great-granddaughter of actress Fanny Schiller and great-great-granddaughter of actress Virginia Fábregas, her grandparents, great-grandmother and great-great-grandmother belong to the Golden Age of Mexican cinema. She studied acting and dramaturgy at the Televisa Centro de Educación Artística from which she left in 2011.

Filmography

References

External links 
 

People educated at Centro de Estudios y Formación Actoral
Living people
1991 births
People from Mexico City
Mexican people of Spanish descent
Mexican people of German descent
21st-century Mexican actresses
Mexican telenovela actresses